Twin Peaks: Fire Walk with Me is a 1992 psychological horror film directed by David Lynch and written by Lynch and Robert Engels. It serves as a prequel to the television series Twin Peaks (1990–1991), created by Mark Frost and Lynch, who were also executive producers. It revolves around the investigation into the murder of Teresa Banks (Pamela Gidley) and the last seven days in the life of Laura Palmer (Sheryl Lee), a popular high school student in the fictional Washington town of Twin Peaks. Unlike the series, which was an uncanny blend of detective fiction, horror, the supernatural, offbeat humor, and soap opera tropes, the film has a much darker, less humorous tone.

Most of the television cast reprised their roles, though the majority of their scenes were cut. A few notable cast members, including Lara Flynn Boyle, Sherilyn Fenn, and Richard Beymer, did not reappear for various reasons. Boyle's character Donna Hayward was recast with Moira Kelly. Kyle MacLachlan, who starred as Special Agent Dale Cooper in the series, was reluctant to return out of fear of being typecast, which resulted in a smaller presence in the film than originally planned.

At the time of its initial release Fire Walk with Me polarized critics in the United States. However, it became positively re-evaluated in the 21st century, with some critics considering the film one of Lynch's major works. Although it has long been reported that it received boos and jeers from the audience at the 1992 Cannes Film Festival, where it was nominated for the Palme d'Or, co-writer Robert Engels denies this happened. The film was a box office failure in the United States, but fared much better in Japan. Its two planned sequels were cancelled, but 91 minutes worth of deleted scenes were released in 2014 through the compilation Twin Peaks: The Missing Pieces, and the story's narrative continued through the 2017 miniseries Twin Peaks: The Return.

Plot

Deer Meadow prologue
In 1988, in the small town of Deer Meadow, Washington teenage drifter Teresa Banks' body floats down a river, wrapped in plastic. FBI Regional Bureau Chief Gordon Cole sends agents Chester Desmond and Sam Stanley to investigate.

While examining Teresa's body, the agents notice that a ring is missing from her finger, and find a small piece of paper with the letter "T" inserted under the fingernail. A local waitress later tells them that Teresa's arm went numb before she died. At Teresa's trailer, Desmond notices a photo of her wearing a strange ring. At dusk, Desmond finds the ring on a mound under a trailer. He reaches out to take it.

At FBI headquarters in Philadelphia, Agent Dale Cooper tells Cole of his foreboding dream. Their long-lost colleague, Agent Phillip Jeffries, materializes and insanely rants about a meeting he witnessed involving mysterious spirits. A vision of these spirits—The Jumping Man, The Man from Another Place, Killer BOB, Mrs. Chalfont and her grandson—appears briefly before Jeffries vanishes. Sitting nearby, Agent Albert Rosenfield reports that Jeffries was never there and Desmond has disappeared. To search for Desmond, Cooper is sent to  Deer Meadow, but he learns nothing.

The Last Seven Days of Laura Palmer
One year later in Twin Peaks, high school homecoming queen Laura Palmer uses cocaine and cheats on her boyfriend Bobby Briggs with biker James Hurley. She discovers that pages are missing from her secret diary, and gives the rest of it to her agoraphobic friend Harold Smith for safekeeping.

Mrs. Chalfont and her grandson later appear to Laura. They present a small framed picture for her wall, and warn her that the "man behind the mask" is in her bedroom. Laura runs home and sees BOB behind her dresser. She rushes outside in terror and sees her father, Leland, emerge from the house. That evening, Leland accusingly questions Laura about her romances and screams at her to wash her hands. At bedtime, he offers her a tearful apology.

After hanging the picture on her wall, Laura dreams about entering the Lodge. There, she sees Cooper and the Man from Another Place, who identifies himself as the arm and offers Teresa's ring to Laura. Cooper tells her not to take it. Laura sees Annie Blackburn next to her in bed, covered in blood. Annie tells Laura to write in her diary that "the good Dale is in the Lodge and cannot leave," then disappears. Laura sees the ring in her hand, but when she wakes up, it is gone.

That night, Laura goes to The Roadhouse, a bar where she works as an underage prostitute. From there, Laura and her pimp Jacques Renault, along with two of their clients, relocate to another bar just over the border in Canada. Donna Hayward, Laura's best friend, is naive to prostitution and hard drug use. She follows Laura there and crashes the group. After seeing a drugged and topless Donna making out with her "John", Laura drags her off. She begs Donna not to become like her.

The next morning, Philip Gerard, the one-armed man possessed by the spirit MIKE, approaches Leland and Laura. He shows Teresa's ring to Laura while accosting Leland about canned corn. Leland remembers his affair with Teresa. He had asked Teresa to set up a foursome with her friends, but fled after glimpsing Laura among them. Teresa realized who he was and plotted to blackmail him, so Leland murdered her. While Leland and MIKE yell, Laura becomes greatly disturbed, and screams at them to stop. MIKE quickly drives away.

That night in a forest, Bobby and Laura wait for Jacques' drug contact. They are approached by Deputy Cliff, who produces a package of white powder. He fumbles to draw a gun, but Bobby shoots first, killing Cliff.

The next night, while she is high on cocaine, BOB comes through Laura's window and rapes her. She asks, "Who are you?" and sees that BOB is her father.

Laura attends school in distress. Deciding she is using him for cocaine access, Bobby breaks up with her. Laura is increasingly erratic and disturbed. At night, she ends her relationship with James, jumps off his motorcycle and escapes to a cabin in the woods, where Jacques, Leo Johnson, and underage prostitute Ronette Pulaski are waiting. The four take cocaine and have sex. During it, Jacques ties Laura up and rapes her. Leland shows up and beats Jacques unconscious while Leo flees. Leland takes Laura and Ronette to an abandoned train car. Laura asks him if he is going to kill her. BOB tells her that he wants to be her. BOB pummels Ronette unconscious. MIKE, having tracked Leland there, rescues Ronette and tosses Teresa's ring into the train car. Laura wears it. Enraged, BOB kills Laura and sends her body, wrapped in plastic, floating down a river. He then passes into the Red Room, encountering MIKE and the Man from Another Place. Together they demand their "garmonbozia" (translated onscreen as "pain and sorrow") from BOB, as a separated Leland floats beside, unaware.

Epilogue
Laura's dead body is discovered by the residents of Twin Peaks. Agent Cooper comforts her in the Red Room. She sees her angel floating above and cries tears of joy.

Cast

The following actors and characters appear in scenes cut from the theatrical version but later compiled in Twin Peaks: The Missing Pieces. After the Cannes showing, Lynch commented on having to cut characters from the theatrical version: "It was a little bit of a sadness, [...] You'd like to have everybody there, but their characters didn't have a bearing on the life of her [Laura Palmer].":

Production
Aaron Spelling Productions wanted to produce a third season of Twin Peaks, but ABC cancelled the series due to declining ratings and high production cost. Lynch and Spelling Productions decided to conclude the series as a film trilogy, quickly securing a $75 million three-film deal with the French company Ciby 2000 and announcing the first film just a month after the series' cancellation. Lynch and co-creator Mark Frost, whose relationship soured during the second season, disagreed on whether to make the project a conventional sequel or a non-linear prequel. Frost ultimately left and directed his own film Storyville.

Lynch wanted to make a Twin Peaks film because, as he claimed in an interview, "I couldn't get myself to leave the world of Twin Peaks. I was in love with the character of Laura Palmer and her contradictions: radiant on the surface but dying inside. I wanted to see her live, move and talk. I was in love with that world and I hadn't finished with it. But making the movie wasn't just to hold onto it; it seemed that there was more stuff that could be done", and that he was "not yet finished with the material". Actress Sheryl Lee, who played Laura Palmer, echoed these sentiments. "I never got to be Laura alive, just in flashbacks; it allowed me to come full circle with the character." According to Lynch, the movie is about "the loneliness, shame, guilt, confusion and devastation of the victim of incest. It also dealt with the torment of the father – the war within him."

The film was originally going to begin filming in August 1991. But on July 11, 1991, Ken Scherer, CEO of Lynch/Frost productions, announced that the film was not going to be made because series star Kyle MacLachlan did not want to reprise his role of Special Agent Dale Cooper to avoid typecasting. MacLachlan's reluctance was also caused by a decline of quality in the second season of the show. He said "David and Mark [Frost] were only around for the first season... I think we all felt a little abandoned. So I was fairly resentful when the film, Fire Walk with Me, came around." A month later, MacLachlan agreed to appear and pre-production resumed. As a compromise MacLachlan demanded a smaller role, only appearing for five days of shooting. Lynch and co-writer Robert Engels rewrote the screenplay so that Teresa Banks's murder was investigated by Agent Chester Desmond and not by Cooper as originally planned.

The film was made without Twin Peaks series regulars Lara Flynn Boyle, Sherilyn Fenn, and Richard Beymer. At the time, these absences were attributed to scheduling conflicts, but in a 1995 interview, Fenn said that her real reason was that she "was extremely disappointed in the way the second season got off track. As far as Fire Walk with Me, it was something that I chose not to be a part of." In a 2014 interview, however, Fenn said that it was a scheduling conflict with Of Mice and Men that prevented her from committing to the film. In a September 2007 interview, Beymer claimed that he did not appear in any scenes shot for the film, although his character, Benjamin Horne, appeared in the script. Fenn's character was cut from the script, Moira Kelly was cast as Donna, and Beymer's scenes were not filmed.

Principal photography began on September 5, 1991 in Snoqualmie, Washington, and lasted until October of the same year, with four weeks dedicated to locations in Washington and another four weeks of interiors and additional locations in Los Angeles, California. When shooting went over schedule in Seattle, Washington, Laura's death in the train car had to be shot in Los Angeles on soundstage during the last day of shooting, October 31. The production progressed very quickly. David Bowie expressed disappointment with his role in the film, saying "They crammed me. I did all my scenes in four or five days, because I was in rehearsals for the 1991 Tin Machine tour. I was there for only a few days."

Several Twin Peaks regulars filmed scenes but were cut from the final version. These actors included Michael Ontkean (Harry S. Truman), Warren Frost (Will Hayward), Mary Jo Deschanel (Eileen Hayward), Everett McGill (Ed Hurley), Wendy Robie (Nadine Hurley), Jack Nance (Pete Martell), Joan Chen (Jocelyn Packard), Kimmy Robertson (Lucy Moran), Harry Goaz (Andy Brennan), Michael Horse (Tommy "Hawk" Hill), Russ Tamblyn (Dr. Jacoby), Don S. Davis (Garland Briggs), and Charlotte Stewart (Betty Briggs). Their scenes are among The Missing Pieces, included on the Twin Peaks Blu-ray box set. After the Cannes showing, Lynch said "It was a little bit of a sadness, [...] You'd like to have everybody there, but their characters didn't have a bearing on the life of her [Laura Palmer]".

Release
Twin Peaks: Fire Walk with Me received a reaction quite the contrary to the television series. The film was entered into the 1992 Cannes Film Festival, where it was met with a polarized response. There is a persistent story that the film was met with boos and hisses from the Cannes audience, though co-writer Robert Engels denies that this event ever happened and a contemporary news report only says there were some "hoots and whistles" during a screening for critics and journalists.

According to Roger Ebert from the Chicago Sun-Times, the film was met with two extremes, one side being overall positive, while the other side being the exact opposite. Filmmaker Quentin Tarantino, who was also in attendance, said in a 1992 interview, "After I saw Twin Peaks: Fire Walk with Me at Cannes, David Lynch had disappeared so far up his own ass that I have no desire to see another David Lynch movie until I hear something different. And you know, I loved him. I loved him."

According to Lynch, Francis Bouygues (then head of CIBY) was not well-liked in France and this only added to complications at the festival.

U.S. distributor New Line Cinema released the film in America on August 28, 1992. It grossed a total of US$1.8 million in 691 theaters in its opening weekend and went on to gross a total of $4.2 million in North America.

Despite its mixed critical and poor commercial response, Fire Walk with Me gained attention at awards time. The film was nominated for five Saturn Awards and two Independent Spirit Awards, including Sheryl Lee being nominated for Best Actress. Angelo Badalamenti's musical score subsequently won a Spirit Award, a Saturn Award and a Brit Award.

Reception

Initial reviews
Upon its release, the film received polarized reviews from American critics. Among the negative reviews, Janet Maslin from The New York Times wrote, "Mr. Lynch's taste for brain-dead grotesque has lost its novelty". Fellow Times film critic Vincent Canby concurred, "It's not the worst movie ever made; it just feels like it". In his review for Variety magazine, Todd McCarthy said, "Laura Palmer, after all the talk, is not a very interesting or compelling character and long before the climax has become a tiresome teenager". USA Today gave the film one-and-a-half stars out of four, calling it, "dark and depressing". Rolling Stone magazine's Peter Travers wrote, "though the movie ups the TV ante on nudity, language and violence, Lynch's control falters. But if inspiration is lacking, talent is not. Count Lynch down but never out". In her review for The Washington Post, Rita Kempley described the film as a "perversely moving, profoundly self-indulgent prequel". An exception among American reviews at the time of the film's release came from novelist Steve Erickson, who defended the film in the L.A. Weekly and challenged its reception; in 1998, critic Manohla Dargis, writing in the same publication, called his review  "one of the bravest pieces of film criticism I've read."

More positive reviews came from British film critics. Kim Newman from the British magazine Sight & Sound stated: "The film's many moments of horror [...] demonstrate just how tidy, conventional and domesticated the generic horror movie of the 1980s and 1990s has become". However, not all British film critics were praising. Barry Norman declared it "baffling", whilst praising Lynch as "a very original filmmaker, and since there are so few of those about, we ought perhaps to give him the benefit of the doubt, and indulge him a little."

On Metacritic, the film has a weighted average score of 45 out of 100, based on 29 critics, indicating "mixed or average reviews".

Reappraisal
Later retrospective analysis of the film has trended positive, with critic Mark Kermode writing in 2007 that many have come to consider the film a "masterpiece". In a 2002 review, Ed Gonzalez of Slant Magazine gave the film four out of four stars, and the following year, the publication included it in their list of "100 Essential Films". The film is also listed at #11 on the publication’s list of "The 100 Best Films of the 1990s" and at #18 on the IndieWire list of "The 100 Best Movies of the ‘90s".

In 2013, The Village Voice wrote of the film, “in its own singular way, Fire Walk With Me is David Lynch’s masterpiece,” while further stating, “Blue Velvet, devised as a kind of distorted TV soap, dug up a small town’s sordid secrets, suggesting that all seemingly good things have a dark side. But Fire Walk With Me taps into something considerably more terrifying: not only the evil buried somewhere in the quintessential middle-class family, but the evil buried somewhere in all of us, and our capacity for it.” In his review for Time Out, Tom Huddleston gave the film five stars out of five and writes, “There's nothing so dark and demented as Fire Walk With Me, the simplest, strangest, saddest and arguably greatest of all his (Lynch’s) films. The critics sneered, the fans balked and the public stayed away in droves. It's their loss: this was a beautiful new kind of madness, terrifying, exhausting and exhilarating in equal measure.” The film is subsequently ranked #31 on Time Out’s list of “The 50 best 90s movies.” Film critic Robbie Collin, writing for The Telegraph, calls the film “a widely misunderstood masterpiece,” stating, “it restores Twin Peaks to writhing, screaming life...Far from cheating viewers, this fresh perspective offered them a new way to decode the entire Twin Peaks mythos, with Sheryl Lee’s extraordinary, soul-tearing performance shaking the franchise out of its cherry-pie-munching reverie...Time has passed, and its brilliance is gradually coming into focus, just as Lynch hoped it would.”

Appearing on the podcast The Cinephiliacs in 2015, filmmaker James Gray called it "an incredible film", "a masterpiece", and "a classic example of how the critics get it wrong." Further speaking of the film, he said, "I've never seen a movie that's been made in the last 30 years [...] in America, which so asks us to understand and be in the shoes of a person suffering so profoundly. It's a thing of beauty." Filmmaker Gregg Araki has also stated, “Sheryl Lee’s performance in this movie is, I think seriously, one of the greatest performances in the history of cinema.” Araki subsequently included the film in his personal Top 10 list of the greatest films of all time during the 2012 Sight & Sound directors’ poll.

In the book Lynch on Lynch, Chris Rodley described the film as "brilliant but excoriating", writing that "by the time Lynch unveiled Twin Peaks: Fire Walk With Me in 1992, critical reaction had become hostile, and only now is the movie enjoying a degree of cautious but sympathetic critical re-evaluation. It is, undoubtedly, one of Lynch's cruellest, bleakest neighbourhood visions, and even managed to displease die-hard fans of the series. [...] In exposing the very heart of the television series, Lynch was forced to accept that he was unlikely to return to the town of Twin Peaks again."

Writer Lindsay Hallam, author of a forthcoming book about the film, attributes the initial negative reaction to the film as being due to the following: "Lynch does not let [the audience] off the hook – we are taken so far into Laura's experience, without any respite and with none of the humour associated with the series".

In an article for The Guardian published in 2017, critic Martyn Conterio wrote of the film's reappraisal: “Fire Walk With Me is not just an artistic triumph in its own right, it’s the key to the entire Twin Peaks universe. A quarter of a century on, the film is being rightly rediscovered by fans and critics as Lynch's unsung masterwork. It took a long time, and it took its toll on its maker, but Fire Walk With Me has finally come in from the cold."

In 2019, the film was ranked the 4th best film of the 1990s by the British Film Institute.

Legacy
According to cinematographer Ron Garcia, the film was popular in Japan, in particular with women, as Martha Nochimson wrote in her book on Lynch's work, "he surmises that the enthusiasm of the Japanese women comes from a gratification of seeing in Laura some acknowledgment of their suffering in a repressive society." Released under the title Twin Peaks: The Last Seven Days of Laura Palmer, it was greeted with long lines of moviegoers at theaters.

In retrospect, Lynch has said, "I feel bad that Fire Walk with Me did no business and that a lot of people hated the film. But I really like the film. But it had a lot of baggage with it. It's as free and as experimental as it could be within the dictates it had to follow."

Mary Sweeney, the film's editor, said, "They so badly wanted it to be like the TV show, and it wasn't. It was a David Lynch feature. And people were very angry about it. They felt betrayed."

Sheryl Lee is very proud of the film, saying, "I have had many people, victims of incest, approach me since the film was released, so glad that it was made because it helped them to release a lot."

Twin Peaks: The Return 
The film contains a dream sequence in which Annie says the line “The good Dale is in the lodge and can’t leave. Write it in your diary.” This was originally intended to set up two more films in which Laura's diary entry was discovered, continuing and then concluding the series' narrative in a non-linear style going across time. However, the two planned sequels were cancelled because of the poor performance of the film. By 2001, Lynch said that the Twin Peaks franchise is "dead as a doornail." In 2014, however, it was announced that the series would continue with Lynch involved. Lynch confirmed that Twin Peaks: Fire Walk with Me would be significant to the events of the miniseries. In 2017, Twin Peaks: The Return was released. It serves as the third season of the series and depicts events which happen 25 years after the conclusion of the second season, and uses many elements introduced in Fire Walk with Me.

Home media
Twin Peaks: Fire Walk With Me was released on VHS by New Line Home Video on January 6, 1993; a LaserDisc edition was also released that year.

Lynch originally shot more than five hours of footage that was subsequently cut down to two hours and fourteen minutes. The footage nearly appeared on New Line Cinema's Special Edition DVD in February 2002, but was nixed over budgetary and running-time concerns. The film was released on DVD in several other regions in the early 2000s as well, including the United Kingdom (Region 2) in 2001 and Australia (Region 4) in 2005.

Most of the deleted scenes feature additional characters from the television series who ultimately did not appear in the finished film. Lynch has said that "I had a limit on the running time of the picture. We shot many scenes that—for a regular feature—were too tangential to keep the main story progressing properly. We thought it might be good sometime to do a longer version with these other things in, because a lot of the characters that are missing in the finished movie had been filmed. They're part of the picture, they're just not necessary for the main story." According to Lynch, had the film included these scenes, it "wouldn't have been quite so dark. To me it obeyed the laws of Twin Peaks. But a little bit of the goofiness had to be removed."

In 2007, DVDrama.com reported that MK2 was in final negotiations with Lynch about a new two-disc special edition that would include seventeen deleted scenes hand-picked by the director himself. It had been tentatively scheduled for release on October 17, 2007, but MK2 subsequently opted instead to re-release a bare-bones edition of Fire Walk with Me, citing a new version including the deleted scenes has been put on hold indefinitely. In November 2008, Lynch said the following regarding the deleted scenes:

Twin Peaks: Fire Walk with Me is owned by a company called MK2 in France. And I spoke to them a couple of months ago. [...] I've spoke to them several times about this. [...] I think it will happen, but maybe the financial crisis is [...] affecting that in some way. I'm not sure what's going on. I'm pretty sure there's seventeen scenes in that at least but it's been a while since we've looked into that.

Paramount Pictures, which has DVD distribution rights to the TV series via CBS Home Entertainment, acquired the rights in Germany and most of the world excluding the US, UK, France and Canada. Paramount/CBS released their DVD in 2007. The DVD was a port straight from the MK2 French edition.

Fire Walk with Me was released on Blu-ray in France on November 3, 2010 by MK2.

The film was released on DVD and Blu-ray in Australia by Madman Entertainment on February 8, 2012, marking the 20th anniversary of the film's theatrical release.

The film was also released on Blu-ray on June 4, 2012 in the UK by Universal UK Home Video, although it has been reported that the release suffers from defects in the audio track. The film was released on Blu-ray in North America on July 29, 2014, as part of the Twin Peaks entire mystery Blu-ray collection, and contains more than 90 minutes of deleted and extended scenes from the film.

The film premiered on Showtime on March 1, 2017, in honor of the series continuation.

The film was released as part of the Criterion Collection (whose parent company, Janus Films, currently owns the North American rights), on both DVD and Blu-Ray Disc, on 17 October 2017.

The Criterion version of the film was re-released as part of Twin Peaks: From Z to A, a 21-disc limited edition Blu-ray box set, which aside from the film also includes all three television seasons in their entirety, The Missing Pieces, previously released special features, six hours of new behind-the-scenes content, and 4K versions of the original pilot and episode 8 from The Return, released on December 10, 2019. However, this collection lacks two Criterion-exclusive interviews that were on their release of the film.

Soundtrack

The soundtrack to Twin Peaks: Fire Walk with Me was released on Warner Bros. Records on August 11, 1992. It includes music by Angelo Badalamenti, who had composed and conducted the music on the television series and its original soundtrack.

In addition to his instrumental compositions, Fire Walk with Mes soundtrack features vocal accompaniment to Badalamenti's songs by jazz vocalist Jimmy Scott and dream pop singer Julee Cruise. Badalamenti performs vocals on "A Real Indication" and "The Black Dog Runs at Night", two songs by the Thought Gang, a musical project between Badalamenti and David Lynch. Lynch wrote the lyrics for several of the soundtrack's songs, including "Sycamore Trees", "Questions in a World of Blue", "A Real Indication" and "The Black Dog Runs at Night", and was the soundtrack's producer alongside Badalamenti.

Upon its release, Fire Walk with Mes soundtrack charted in the United States, peaking at number 173 on the Billboard 200. It was nominated for, and later received, the Best Music at the 1992 Saturn Awards and Best Original Score at the Independent Spirit Awards. In March 2011, British music publication NME placed Twin Peaks: Fire Walk with Mes soundtrack at number 1 on their list of the 50 Best Film soundtracks Ever, describing it as "combining plangent beauty with a kind of clanking evil jazz, this is one of those endlessly evocative soundtracks that takes up residence in your subconscious and never leaves."

Awards and nominations

References

Sources

External links

 
 
 
 

Twin Peaks
1992 films
1992 horror films
1990s avant-garde and experimental films
1990s psychological horror films
American avant-garde and experimental films
American psychological horror films
1990s English-language films
Films about the Federal Bureau of Investigation
Filicide in fiction
Films about dreams
Films based on television series
Films directed by David Lynch
Films scored by Angelo Badalamenti
Films set in 1988
Films set in 1989
Films set in Philadelphia
Films set in Portland, Oregon
Films set in Washington (state)
Films shot in Washington (state)
Films with screenplays by David Lynch
French avant-garde and experimental films
English-language French films
French psychological horror films
Incest in film
New Line Cinema films
Prequel films
1990s American films
American prequel films
French prequel films
1990s French films